Lennik is a municipality located in the Belgian province of Flemish Brabant. The municipality comprises the towns of Sint-Kwintens-Lennik, Sint-Martens-Lennik, Eizeringen and Gaasbeek. It is also situated in the Pajottenland. On January 1, 2006, Lennik had a total population of 8,694. The total area is 30.80 km² which gives a population density of 282 inhabitants per km².

On its territory is the national Gaasbeek Castle museum.
A 4 metre high statue of Prince (a traditional plough horse) stands on the Market Place.

References

External links
 
Official website - Available only in Dutch
QW1i's official website - Available only in Dutch
Chiro Lennik Official Website - Available only in Dutch

Municipalities of Flemish Brabant